The 4th Congress of the Communist Party of Yugoslavia (Serbo-Croatian Latin: Četvrti kongres Komunističke partije Jugoslavije, Cyrillic: Четврти конгрес Комунистичке партије Југославије) was a congress of the Communist Party of Yugoslavia (CPY) held from 6 to 12 November 1928, in Zonenland, Dresden, in Weimar Republic. It was held outside Yugoslavia because the CPY was banned by the Yugoslav authorities.

Delegates 
The delegates attending the congress included Sima Marković, Milorad Petrović, Živojin Pecarski, and Kočo Racin.

Destruction of Yugoslavia 
The Communist Party of Yugoslavia set destruction of Yugoslavia as one of its main goals which was to be achieved by strict adherence to the right to the self determination of nations. The strategy of the Communist Party of Yugoslavia relied on nationalistic anti-Serbian movements. This strategy was based on the resolution of the Third Congress of the CPY aimed against Serbian bourgeoisie perceived as "oppresor" who evolved from "oppressive Serb people". It was also based on the conclusions of the Fifth Congress of Comintern which posed the principle of "federal system of national states", setting the stage for the Croatian secession, independence of Macedonia and supporting Albanian nationalistic movement.

Croatian separatism 
The 4th congress gave new impulse to the Croatian separatists and presented communists as deadly enemies of Yugoslav state.

Montenegrin nation 
At the Fourth Congress of the CPY in Dresden came up the first reference to the Montenegrin nation.

References

Sources 

 
 
 
 
 
 
 

1928
1928 in Germany
1928 in politics
1928 conferences
Congresses of communist parties
Anti-Serbian sentiment